Middelfart Boldklub is a Danish football club which plays in the Danish 3rd Division, the fourth tier of Danish football. They play at Middelfart Stadion in Middelfart, which has a capacity of 4,100.

History 
Middelfart Gymnastik & Idræts Klub (MG&IK) was founded on 25 May 1900 and shortly after the end of World War II it merged with its local neighbours from Middelfart Boldklub. Since 2015, the football department of Middelfart G&BK has been organised under the name Middelfart Boldklub ApS with the aim of transitioning into a professional football club, whereas the amateur section has continued under the name Middelfart G&BK. Middelfart Boldklub therefore has the license to the divisional team (third highest level of Danish football) and leases the Middelfart G&BK facility. Thereby, Middelfart Boldklub also has access to the pitches and clubhouse and uses the stadium, Middelfart Stadion at Adlerhusvej, where there are also changing rooms and public facilities.

On 21 November 2015, Middelfart Boldklub signed its first professional player, Oluwafemi Ajilore after the Danish Football Union (DBU) has approved the club as an Anpartsselskab ("private company limited by shares").

Christian Eriksen and Rasmus Falk are both former Middelfart G&BK players.

Players

Current squad

References

External links
 Official website for the amateur section 

 
Football clubs in Denmark
Association football clubs established in 1900
Middelfart Municipality
1900 establishments in Denmark